Young Stunners are a Pakistani Urdu-language hip hop duo formed in Karachi in 2012. The duo is composed of Talha Anjum and Talhah Yunus. Much of their music is produced by Jokhay.

Talha Anjum and Talhah Yunus rose to fame as rappers on YouTube after releasing their first song "Burger-e-Karachi". Some of their major hits to date include: the collaborative 2021 PSL anthem Groove Mera, their performance at the 2021 Pakistan Day Parade and their music video "Afsanay".

They are often credited for introducing Urdu rap into the mainstream Pakistani music scene.

History
The group consist of two Urdu-language rappers, Talha Anjum and Talhah Yunus. Both were born and raised in Karachi. Both got their education at the Army Public School, Saddar and have been best friends since the age of 16. The group was formed on 2 July 2012 and started releasing music in the same year. Their debut singles "Burger-e-Karachi", a satirical take at the westernised and out-of-touch urban elites of Karachi, and "Maila Majnu" were some of songs that were widely popular. In 2017, they released their debut album "Rebirth".

In July 2020, they collaborated with Asim Azhar, Shamoon Ismail, and Raamis on the track "Tum Tum". In September 2021, they released the track "Why Not" as part of a promotional campaign for Pepsi. In March 2022, they collaborated with Faisal Kapadia on the final track of Coke Studio (Season 14) titled "Phir Milenge".

Members

Talha Anjum

Talha Anjum was born on 3rd October 1995 in Karachi, Pakistan and attended the Army Public School there. He began his career doing rap battles in school times. Talha Anjum used local issues and references to gain audience relevancy. There stands no doubt about his poetry's energizing thrill. He's the perfect fit for any genre or category and he's been proving it lately. Talhah Yunus realised his potential, they formed the music duo known today as Young Stunners.

He has two brothers.

Talhah Yunus 

Talhah Yunus was born on 21 October 1996 in Karachi. Talhah Yunus would also release diss tracks and soon their first single "Burger-e-Karachi" made charts. He also has a standalone mixtape as a solo artist named "6IX".

Discography

Albums

Singles and collaborations

Live performances

See also 
Desi hip hop
Pakistani hip hop music

References 

Pakistani musical groups